Yuanshi society (原始社會) is a term to describe the early ancient tribal society around the time of the Three Sovereigns and Five Emperors era in ancient Chinese history and mythology.  The term literally means "primitive society".

Tribe chart
Below is a sample of some of the existing tribes at the time. Depending on the sources Chi You may fall within many tribe groups.

See also
 Chinese people
 Ethnic groups in Chinese history
 Ethnic minorities in China
 List of ethnic groups in China
 List of Neolithic cultures of China

References

History of ancient China